Gallium hydroxide, Ga(OH)3 is formed as a gel following the addition of ammonia to Ga3+ salts. It is also found in nature as the rare mineral söhngeite which is reported to contain octahedrally coordinated gallium atoms
Gallium hydroxide is amphoteric. In strongly acidic conditions, the gallium ion, Ga3+ is formed. In strongly basic conditions, Ga(OH)4− is formed. Salts of Ga(OH)4− are sometimes called gallates.

References

Hydroxides
Gallium compounds